A lint roller or lint remover is a roll of one-sided adhesive paper on a cardboard or plastic barrel that is mounted on a central spindle, with an attached handle.  The device facilitates the removal of lint or other small fibers from most materials such as clothing, upholstery and linen. Once expended, the roll can typically be replaced with a "refill" roll. Invented in 1956 by Nicholas McKay, Sr., his most well-known (and first commercial) product was the Lint Pic-Up, the world's first lint roller.

Reusable lint rollers use elastomers, including silicones and polystyrene-ethylene-butylene-styrene as a reusable tacky surface. 
The material is similar to polymers used in walking toys such as Wacky WallWalker.

A lint roller's design enables fast 360 degree rotation, which facilitates the easy removal of unsightly fiber (often animal hair). Lint rollers can be purchased in many sizes, from pet stores, supermarkets and online.

The product is popular among dog and cat owners, as it will also remove dog and cat hair from fabrics, carpets etc.

A similar device, the lint brush uses a fabric cushion mounted to a handle, that when rubbed one way across the fabric to be cleaned, picks up the small fibers. By reversing the direction of movement across the fabric or by picking off the excess lint, it is possible to clean the lint brush. Some lint brushes are double sided in order to allow the brush to be used in both directions and to extend the use of the brush by limiting wear.

References

Cleaning tools
American inventions